Martin Kirilov Bogdanov (born on 3 January 1970) is a Bulgarian journalist,TV presenter, writer and poet.

Biography 
In 1984 he began his secondary education at the German High School in Sofia – 91 ESUU "Karl Liebknecht". From 1990 to 1995 he studied at the University of Forestry. in Sofia. From 1994 to 1998 – his second higher education was in television journalism at the "Faculty of Journalism and Mass Communication" at University of Sofia.

Career 
Since 1994, Karbovski has worked in almost all major Bulgarian newspapers, among which: Trud, 24 chasa, 168 Hours, Novinar, Standard. In 2002, Karbovski began cooperating with Kevork Kevorkian in the show Vsyaka nedelya (Bulgarian broadcast) on national television, where he made his "Regular Reporting" and "Subjective".

Written books 
„Дефлорация" (1995), „Едно" (1998), „Обществен eXperiment" (2003), „Пътеписите" (2005)р, „Технология на естаза" (2009), „Нещата" (2011)

References

External links
 Official website

Journalists from Sofia
1970 births
Living people